Bono, also known as Abron, Brong, and Bono Twi, is a Central Tano language common to the Bono people and a major dialect of the Akan dialect continuum, and thus mutually intelligible with the principal Akan dialects of Asante and Akuapem, collectively known as Twi. It is spoken by 1.2 million in Ghana, primarily in the Central Ghanaian region of Brong-Ahafo, and by over 300,000 in eastern Ivory Coast.

Relationship with other dialects of Akan 
Bono is mutually intelligible with all dialects of Akan, but the degree of intelligibility depends on the geographical distance between the dialects. Bono is geographically close to Asante, and therefore linguistically close, while a further-away dialect such as Fante is linguistically further as well. Most speakers of Bono are bilingual or bidialectal with Asante.

Along with Fante, Bono is the most conservative dialect of Akan, retaining several features, such as the third-person plural pronoun bɛ, that have since been lost elsewhere in Akan.

Differences from other dialects of Akan

Phonological 

 Bono tends to use /h/ where other Akan varieties have palatalized it to hy (/ɕ/) and hw (/ɕʷ/): cf. Bono hia vs. other Akan hyia ("to meet").
 Bono has [l] and [r] in free variation, where other Akan varieties have only /r/ or only /l/. As Akan generally has [d] in complementary distribution with [r], there are some Bono words with [l], [r], and [d] in free variation, e.g. fiela/fiera/fieda ("Friday"). A similar process may be found in some varieties of Asante, e.g. akɔlaa/akɔraa/akɔdaa ("child").
 In most Akan dialects, the emphatic particle nà is pronounced with a low tone, whereas in Bono it is né, with a high tone.
 Unlike other varieties of Akan, and most Kwa languages in general, which have nominal vowel prefixes, many Bono nouns have either a homorganic nasal prefix or no nasal prefix at all: cf. Bono pɔnkɔ vs. other Akan ɔpɔnkɔ ("horse"). Conversely, while most dialects have lost the nominal vowel suffix, Bono as well as Asante have retained it: cf. Bono nsuo vs. other Akan nsu ("water"). Asante is the only dialect to have retained both vowel prefix and suffix: cf. Bono wuo, Asante owuo, and other Akan owu ("death").

Grammatical 

 The most characteristic feature of Bono is its use of the third-person plural pronoun bɛ, not found in any other Akan dialect. It was likely an old pronoun retained in Bono but not elsewhere in Akan.
 Akan subject markers are usually only used when a subject is not made explicit, and are only ever used alongside an explicit subject in emphatic sentences. However, in Bono, an explicit subject is almost always used alongside a subject marker, whether the sentence is emphatic or not: cf. other Akan Kofi kɔe ("Kofi went", with explicit subject and without subject marker) and ɔkɔe ("He went", with subject marker) vs. Bono Kofi ɔkɔe (literally "Kofi he went", with explicit subject and subject marker). Similarly, Bono requires a possessor as well as a possessive pronoun, e.g. Kofi ne dan (literally "Kofi his house"), although this is a feature found in Fante and Akuapem.
 In Bono, the first-person singular prefixes me- reduce to a homorganic syllabic nasal when they occur immediately before a consonant, e.g. mbaeɛ ("I came"), whereas other Akan dialects do not reduce it, e.g. mebae ("I came").
 Bono does not distinguish the third-person singular animate ɔ- and inanimate ɛ- possessive prefixes common to other Akan dialects, instead using ɔ- (sometimes pronounced wɔ-) for both: cf. Bono ɔkɔ ("he/she/it has gone") vs. Akuapem ɔkɔ ("he/she has gone") and ɛkɔ ("it has gone").

Grammar

Pronouns

References

Languages of Ghana
Akan language